Juan Carlos Montiel (born November 12, 1965 in Montevideo) is a retired male boxer from Uruguay. He competed for his native country at the 1988 Summer Olympics in Seoul, South Korea, and won a bronze medal at the 1987 Pan American Games during his career as an amateur. Nicknamed "Tito" he made his professional debut on October 15, 1993, defeating Luiz Augusto Ferreira.

References
Profile

1965 births
Living people
Middleweight boxers
Olympic boxers of Uruguay
Boxers at the 1988 Summer Olympics
Boxers at the 1987 Pan American Games
Pan American Games bronze medalists for Uruguay
Sportspeople from Montevideo
Uruguayan male boxers
Pan American Games medalists in boxing
Medalists at the 1987 Pan American Games